Prestranek is a settlement south of Postojna in the Inner Carniola region of Slovenia.

Prestranek Castle

Prestranek is the location of Prestranek Castle, also known as the Edling Manor, an estate first mentioned in written sources in 1581. In 1728 it was bought by Emperor Charles VI and managed together with the Lipica stud farm. It operated as a royal farm until the First World War, when it was taken over by the army. After the Second World War it was again revived as part of the Lipica Estate. In the 1990s it was privatized, and it now operates as an equestrian centre.

References

External links
 
Prestranek on Geopedia
Prestranek Castle Equestrian Centre site

Populated places in the Municipality of Postojna